[[Image:Funnel otto hahn hg.jpg|thumb|upright|Funnel of Otto Hahn.]]
The German Maritime Museum is a museum in Bremerhaven, Germany. It is part of the Gottfried Wilhelm Leibniz Scientific Community. The main museum building was opened on 5 September 1975 by then-president of Germany Walter Scheel, though scientific work already had started in 1971. In 2000, celebrating the 25th anniversary of the museum, the Hansekogge, a ship constructed around 1380 that was found in the Weser river in 1962, was presented to the public after having undergone a lengthy process of conservation in a large preservative-filled basin.

The museum consists of the building planned by Hans Scharoun as well as several museum ships in the Old Harbour of Bremerhaven, including the Seute Deern windjammer. Since 2005, the buildings and 8 ships are listed as protected heritage ensemble.

 History 
The German Maritime Museum (DSM) was founded in Bremerhaven in 1971 to replace the Museum of Marine Science in Berlin, which had been destroyed during World War II. Its task is to collect, record, research and present documents and  artefacts pertaining to German maritime history. For this purpose, the DSM is equipped with laboratories and technical facilities for the examination, conservation and restoration of different types of water craft as well as other objects. It also houses a wide range of artefact collections and a dedicated archive and specialist library with adjacent reading room. The DSM is publisher of two periodicals as well as four scientific monograph series.

 Research 
DSM research is focussed on the following fields:
 pre-industrial shipping in Central Europe
 German shipping in early modern times
 the impact of industrialisation on German commercial shipping
 the history of marine research
 man's use of the sea's resources through the ages

 Exhibitions 
Permanent exhibitions at the DSM include:

 Central European shipping in the prehistoric, Roman and medieval periods (with the Bremen cog of 1380 as main exhibit)
 German shipping in early modern times (1500 to 1800)
 German shipping in the post-1800 industrial age (with the paddle-steamer "Meißen" of 1881 as main exhibit), military shipping  (with the "Seehund" class submarine of 1945 as main exhibit), industrial ships' engines (with engines and reactor control panel of the nuclear-powered vessel Otto Hahn of 1968 as main exhibit)
 Shipping Channels (navigation, marine cartography, navigation marks, navigable waters)
 Outdoor museum port with coastal, inland and sea vessels from 1867 to 1985 as well as cargo handling equipment, buoys etc. Flagship is the world's largest preserved cargo sailing ship made of wood – the bark Seute Deern of 1919; it was announced in October 2019 that, in the light of a survey which found that the ship is beyond repair, Seute Deern is to be broken up in situ.
 An extension opened in 2000 is home to the other sections – polar and marine research, whaling, deep-sea fishery, sea-rescue as well as sailing as a sport and rowing
 The Wilhelm Bauer'', a sample of the Type XXI submarines operated by the Kriegsmarine for a short time near the end of WW II; this is the last fully intact, floating example of this class of craft.

References

External links 

  

Leibniz Association
Museums established in 1975
Museums in Bremen (state)
Buildings and structures in Bremerhaven
Maritime museums in Germany
1975 establishments in West Germany